Merd may refer to:

Merd-e Now, a village in Iran
Hazar Merd Cave, a group of Paleolithic cave sites in Iraqi Kurdistan

See also
Saint-Merd (disambiguation), several places in central France